Bohuslav Hostinský (1884–1951) was a Czechoslovak mathematician and theoretical physicist.

Family
His father Otakar Hostinský was a musicologist and professor of aesthetics at Charles University. Bohuslav Hostinský was the eldest of four siblings. 

He married Emilie Veselíková (1883–?) in Královské Vinohrady on July 19, 1910. According to the police archive, they lived in Královské Vinohrady. They had two children, the daughter Věra and the son Zdeněk, later well-known chess player and a professor of Brno University of Technology

Studies
After graduating from secondary school, Bohuslav Hostinský studied mathematics and physics at the Faculty of Arts of Prague's Charles University. There in 1907 he received his doctorate with a dissertation on Lie spherical geometry and in the same year he became an adjunct professor at the gymnázium (Gymnasium) in Nový Bydžov, from where in April 1908 he transferred to the gymnázium in Roudnice and eventually to Prague's Reálné gymnázium v Kodaňské. For the academic year 1908–1909 he studied at the Sorbonne in Paris; his time there profoundly influenced his research.

Career
In November 1911 he passed the formal examination for the acceptance of his habilitation thesis at Charles University; the examination committee included Karel Petr, Jan Sobotka, and Vincenc Strouhal. 

On the 9th of August 1920 Hostinský was appointed a full professor of theoretical physics at the Faculty of Science in Brno's Masaryk University, as well as director of the department. He worked there until his death.

Bohuslav Hostinský focused, at the beginning of his career, on differential geometry and then focused on mathematical physics. His research deals with the kinetic theory of gases, probability theory, statistical mechanics, and oscillation theory. He studied the works of the Russian mathematician A. A. Markov and drew attention to them. Hostinský's work on transition probabilities and Markov chains was then further developed by many foreign experts. Laurent Mazliak gave an analysis of the letters exchanged between Hostinský  and Wolfgang Doeblin.

Bohuslav Hostinský was four times an invited speaker at the International Congress of Mathematicians — in Cambridge, England in 1912, in Strasbourg in 1920, in Bologna in 1928, and in Zurich in 1932. He published about 140 papers and several monographs.

From the establishment of the Faculty of Science in Masaryk University until 1948 (with an interruption from 1934 to 1939), he was the editor of the Spisů (research journal) published by this faculty. He was several times dean of the Faculty of Science and from 1929 to 1930 rector. He was a member of many scientific societies and in 1933 he was elected a member extraordinarius of the Czechoslovak Academy of Sciences. He actively participated in the activities of the Brno chapter of the Union of Czech mathematicians and physicists; in the difficult years from 1942 to 1945 he was the chair of the Brno chapter.

Selected publications

Articles

Monographs and books
  (Differential geometry of curves and surfaces)
  (Mechanics of rigid bodies)
 
 with Vito Volterra:

References

1884 births
1951 deaths
Czechoslovak mathematicians
Czechoslovak physicists
People from Prague
Charles University alumni
Academic staff of Masaryk University
University of Paris alumni
Austro-Hungarian expatriates in France